Gandabahali (ଗଣ୍ଡାବାହାଲି, also spelled Ganabeheli) is a village in Sinapali block in the south of Nuapada District in Odisha, India.

Gandabahali is a village surrounded by Chahara forest in the east, Patalganga in the west, Sundar river in the north and Udanti river in the south. Gandabahali is one of the largest villages and a place of historical significance in the Sinapali Block. Local people call it the village of festival, because 13 festivals are celebrated in this village in 12 months. The village has a Gram panchayat (Local Governing Council).

History 
The region of Gandabahali was under the rule of the Chauhan dynasty of Patna State which was established by Ramai Deva of the Chauhan dynasty in the 14th cen CE who were vassals of the Eastern Ganga dynasty which was declining following invasions from the northern part of the Indian subcontinent. The Chauhan reign from Patnagarh continued over the region and later expanded through the establishment of their cadet branches extending their rule over areas of Western Odisha and eastern Chhattisgarh.

In 1600 CE, Raja Gopal Rai who belonged to the Chauhan family of Balangir was crowned as the first king of Khariar. In the year 1820, Raja Ratan Singh Deo (Chauhan King of Khariar) shifted his capital from Komna to Khariar. Then our village came under khariar capital. The region is said to have came under British control in 1828 after Maratha king defeated the Chauhan ruler. In the year 1862 it was in Madhya Pradesh, in 1857 it was under Nagpur, then in 1862 it would be under Raipur.

When Odisha got independence as a state on 1 April 1936, at that time, the village came under the district of Sambalpur. Odisha was reorganised in 1949; at that time, the village came under the district of Kalahandi. After that, on 1 April 1993, Nuapada became a separate district carved out from the undivided kalahandi district. Then, the village comes under the district of Nuapada and the block of Sinapali. It now then becomes a separate Gram Panchayat under the block of Sinapali. It is the biggest gram Panchayat of the Block of Sinapali and is an old village in this particular area of Gandabahali.

Some communities like Damba and Kandha have been living in this village from the ancient time. It is considered that might be the name of the this village as their name of the community. Then, some other communities came to this village and settled there. Most of the people in this village are Bhulia (Meher) Community. They came from the city of Patnagarh and Sambalpur. This village is now known as the Bhulia (Meher) Community.

Geography 
Gandabahali is located in the western part of Odisha, at 20.1532°N 82.7104°E. It is close to the border of Raipur District, Chhattisgarh and Kalahandi District. It is located in a rain shadow belt, in the Mahanadi basin of the Eastern Ghats where mountains are interspersed with wide valleys. The climate is tropical, with rain in the South West monsoon season.

Ramgarh Hill
Ramgarh Hill is a historical site in Gandabahali. It is located in Gandabahali Village. The Ramgarh Hill is a popular tourist destination and it is also called worship place of Maa Gadiaan (Goddess of Gandabahali village). The largest elephant stone is located at this place and it is considered to be the oldest elephant stone in the undivided kalahandi district. According to an ancient belief, Lord Ram brother Lakshman and wife sita had resided in the exile period.

Maa Gadiaan Goddess is the main protector of Gandabahali village. The temple of the goddess is situated in the Ramgarh hill. Some people say that Goddess Maa Gadiaan resides in Ramgarh Hill. Every year a festival called “Chhatar Jatra” at a particular time is organised and many people who have fulfilled wishes come and sacrifice animals in the name of goddess.

 Chhatra Jatra:- Chhatra Jatra or Chatar Jatra or Chatar Yatra are meant to celebrate the Vijaya utsav with cheerful heart and splendid display. The festival is being celebrated during the Dussehra. The ritual practice of Khonds performed during the festival. Maa Gadiaan leaves from Dharnisala early in the morning and Chhatra Yatra begins with village tour. After completing the circumambulation of the Village, Maa Gadiaan goes to Jenakhal situated on the Ramgarh hill at midnight on the day of Chhatar Jatra. Jenakhal which is at about 1 km distance from the Gandabahali. A bamboo covered with colourful cloth represents Maa Gadiaan in the Chhatra jatra.
 Bihan Jatra:- These are different types of festivals in which people worship the goddess/gods for better agriculture in their land. This celebration takes place at midnight.
 Khoael Jatra:- The animal sacrifice prevalent in this festival is held at Prahari Chowk and many wish-fulfillers come and sacrifice animals in the name of the goddess/gods.Though government has strictly banned these kind of activities, still devotees don't follow the rule.
 Pod Puja:- This festival happens once in 35 years. Buffalo (Pod) is sacrificed on this festival. Though government has strictly banned these kind of activities.

Population
Gandabahali has a total population of 2,293, out of which the male population is 1,126 while the female population is 1,167. Literacy rate of gandabahali village is 61.01% out of which 67.50% males and 54.76% females are literate. There are about 551 houses in gandabahali village.

References

Jubilee Book, Silver (12 December 2012). "ଗଣ୍ଡାବାହାଲି ଓ ରାମଗଡ଼ର ଏକ ଐତିହାସିକ ଅବଲୋକନ". Google Docs (in Odia). Gandabahali: Panchayat High School. pp. 29–32. Retrieved 2022-10-11.
 Jubilee Book, Silver (12 December 2012). "ଗାଁ ଗଣ୍ଡାବାହାଲି". Google Docs (in Odia). Gandabahali: Panchayat High School. pp. 46–47. Retrieved 2022-10-11.
 "Gandabahali, Odisha Weather Forecast and Conditions - The Weather Channel | Weather.com". The Weather Channel. Retrieved 2022-10-11.
 "Gandabahali Population (2021/2022), Village in Sinapali Tehsil". www.indiagrowing.com. Retrieved 2022-10-11.
 Rathore, Abhinay. "Khariar (Zamindari)". Rajput Provinces of India. Retrieved 2022-10-11.
 "Nuapada District,Government of Odisha | Website of Nuapada District Administration | India". Retrieved 2022-10-11.
 ଗଣ୍ଡାବାହାଲି ଖବର (facebook page) www.facebook.com. Retrieved 2022-11-07.
 Sahu, Jagna Kumar (1967-06-15). "Chauhan rule in Western Orissa". University.
 Nanda, Siba Prasad (1995) "History and culture of Khariar A critical study". University.
 "Nuapada District Map". web.archive.org. 2021-05-12. Retrieved 2022-10-11.
 News Paper Sources. Retrieved 2022-11-07.
 Mishra, Brundaban. "Social Structure Of Western Orissa Under The Chauhans Of Sambalpur" 
 Ahmad, Naqeeb. "PIN Code of Gandabahali Nuapada District in State of Odisha". Online India Code. Retrieved 2022-12-10.
 Mishra, Mahedra Kumar (2004). "Oral Epics in Kalahandi". Folklore: Electronic Journal of Folklore. 26: 81–100. ISSN 1406-0957.

Citations

External links 

 

Villages in Nuapada district